Kim Sang-woo may refer to:

Kim Sang-woo (footballer, born 1987), South Korean footballer
Kim Sang-woo (footballer, born 1994), South Korean footballer
Kim Sang-woo (referee) (born 1975), South Korean football referee
Kim Sang-woo (volleyball) (born 1973), South Korean volleyball player